The Story of the Malakand Field Force: An Episode of Frontier War was an 1898 book written by Winston Churchill; it was his first published work of non-fiction.

The book describes a military campaign by the British army on the North West Frontier (now western Pakistan and eastern Afghanistan)
in 1897. It is dedicated to General Bindon Blood.

The story of the campaign and Churchill's part in it is told in Churchill's First War: Young Winston and the Fight Against the Taliban (2013) by Con Coughlin.

References

External links
 
 The Story of the Malakand Field Force at archive.org

1898 non-fiction books
Books by Winston Churchill
Books about military history
Books about British India
Military history of Khyber Pakhtunkhwa
English non-fiction literature
Books written by prime ministers of the United Kingdom